3C 66B is an elliptical Fanaroff and Riley class 1 radio galaxy located in the constellation Andromeda. With an estimated redshift of 0.021258, the galaxy is about 300 million light-years away.

The orbital motion of 3C 66B showed supposed evidence for a supermassive black hole binary (SMBHB) with a period of 1.05 ± 0.03 years, but this claim was later proven wrong (at 95% certainty).

Messier 87 (M87), about 55 million light-years away, is the largest giant elliptical galaxy near the Earth, and also contains an active galactic nucleus. The smooth jet of 3C 66B rivals that of M87.

3C 66B is an outlying member of Abell 347 which is part of the Perseus–Pisces Supercluster.

References

External links
 www.jb.man.ac.uk/atlas/ (J. P. Leahy)
 3C66B = B0220+427 (Alan Bridle / 31 May 2006)
 Wikisky image of PGC 9067

Radio galaxies
Seyfert galaxies
066B
Andromeda (constellation)
009067
01841
J02231141+4259313
Elliptical galaxies
Perseus-Pisces Supercluster